Ashvin Matthew is an Indian film and stage actor, stand-up comedian and screenwriter.

Personal life
Matthew is a Malayali who grew up in Bangalore and is currently settled in Cyprus with his wife who is from the country. His father is a doctor and his mother is an agricultural scientist. His first play was Restless: The Spirit of Youth, by Gautam Raja and Meenakshi Menon. He then studied theatre at Sydney before leaving it to study Radio Journalism in Cyprus. He returned to Bangalore and became a stand-up comedian before leaving to become a theatre teacher in Dubai. He subsequently returned to India to become a full-fledged actor.

Career
He began his film career by working with Kukku Surendran to tweak the script of Veeralipattu. He was selected to portray the role of Father Vincent in English Vinglish. Actress Padmapriya suggested his name for Vedivazhipadu, which became his first Malayalam movie. He subsequently went on to act in multiple Malayalam movies. Mathew has also written the script for two Tamil movies, Uthukuli Amigos and Gymkhana Vasu, both of which are in the planning stages of production.

Filmography
As actor

References

Indian stand-up comedians
Living people
Indian male comedians
Male actors in Malayalam cinema
Indian male film actors
21st-century Indian male actors
Male actors from Bangalore
Year of birth missing (living people)